Joe Bankhead (September 8, 1926 – February 4, 1988) was an American baseball player, who played in the Negro leagues.  Bankhead was born and died in Empire, Alabama.  Bankhead was a pitcher and played for the Birmingham Black Barons in 1948.  He later signed with the Grand Rapids Jets of the Central League.

His brothers Sam, Fred, and Garnett all also played in the Negro Leagues, and his brother Dan was the first black pitcher in Major League Baseball.

References

1926 births
1988 deaths
People from Walker County, Alabama
Baseball players from Alabama
Birmingham Black Barons players
Baseball pitchers
20th-century African-American sportspeople